Bathyadmetella is a genus of marine annelids in the family Polynoidae (scale worms). The only species in the genus, Bathyadmetella commando, is known from a single specimen collected at 1646m in the north-west Pacific Ocean.

Description of Bathyadmetella commando
Bathyadmetella commando has 58 segments and 23 pairs of elytra, with reddish-brown body pigmentation. The lateral antennae are inserted terminally on the anterior margin of the prostomium, with auxiliary appendages at the base of the lateral antennae. Bidentate neurochaetae are absent.

References

Phyllodocida
Animals described in 1967